John of Howden OFM (fl. 1268/9–1275), also known as John of Hoveden,  was a 13th-century English Franciscan friar from the north of England, and for a time was chaplain to Queen Eleanor of Provence, wife of King Henry III of England.

Works
John is known only by the various spiritual writings attributed to him. There are certain texts in Latin, including Philomela (Song of Love) (the influence of which may be seen in Richard Rolle's Incendium amoris and Melos amoris); Canticum amoris (Song of Love); Cythara (Cittern); Quinquaginta cantica, Quinquaginta salutationes (Fifty Songs; Fifty Salutations), and several other shorter Latin poems.

There are also works written in Anglo-Norman. One, Li Rossignos (The Nightingale) is a re-working of Howden's own Latin Philomena, with borrowings from the anonymous Desere iam anima (Abandon Now O Soul). Internal evidence suggests the poem was written before 1282.

For a long time, it has been assumed that he was the John of Howden who was prebendary of the church of Howden in Yorkshire. Recently, however, this has been questioned.

References

Further reading
 Poems of John of Hoveden, ed. F. J. E. Raby, Publications of the Surtees Society, no. 154 (1939).
 Johannis de Hovedene Philomena, ed. C. Blume (Leipzig, 1930) [the Latin text of the Philomena].
 Denis Renevey, '1215–1349: texts', in Samuel Fanous and Vincent Gillespie, eds, The Cambridge Companion to Medieval English Mysticism, (Cambridge: Cambridge University Press, 2011).
 A. G. Rigg, "Howden, John of (fl. 1268/9–1275)", Oxford Dictionary of National Biography, (Oxford University Press, 2004).

1275 deaths
13th-century English Roman Catholic priests
People from Howden
Year of birth unknown
English Friars Minor
English male non-fiction writers
Place of death unknown
English religious writers
Franciscan writers